Gold's Gym: Cardio Workout is an exercise video game for Nintendo's Wii video game console, created by Japanese video game developer Rocket Company. Based on the "shape boxing" fitness regimen used at Kyoei Boxing Gym which includes shadowboxing, press-ups, and sit-ups, the game also features a diet management feature. Originally announced in mid-2007 as Wii Exercise with a release target of later that year, in May 2008, the game was stated to still be in an early stage of development. Though not originally intended to feature support for the Wii Balance Board, the feature was announced later. Shape Boxing was released in Japan on October 30, 2008 under the title Shape Boxing: Wii de Enjoy! Diet (シェイプボクシング Wiiでエンジョイダイエット！). The game was licensed by Ubisoft for other regional markets, and released as in Europe as part of the publisher's My Coach series as My Fitness Coach: Cardio Workout, and released in North America and Australia as Gold's Gym: Cardio Workout,  in partnership with the Gold's Gym fitness center chain.

Sequels and successor
Rocket Company released two sequels to the game, Shape Boxing 2: Wii de Enjoy! Diet (シェイプボクシング2 Wiiでエンジョイダイエット！) in 2010 and Billy's Bootcamp: Wii de Enjoy! Diet (ビリーズブートキャンプ Wiiでエンジョイダイエット！) in 2011 in Japan.  The former was also localized for North America as a licensed Gold's Gym tie-in game, like its predecessor, and was titled Gold's Gym: Dance Workout.

In 2016, Rocket Company was merged into its parent company, Imagineer. Imagineer developed and released a spiritual successor, Fitness Boxing, for the Nintendo Switch in 2018.

References

External links
Gold's Gym Cardio Workout
Shape Boxing: Wii de Enjoy! Diet 

2008 video games
Fitness games
Ubisoft games
Video games developed in Japan
Wii games
Wii-only games